The 2020 Ceratizit Challenge by La Vuelta was a women's road cycling stage race held in and near the Spanish capital of Madrid from 6 to 8 November 2020. It was the sixth edition of the Challenge by La Vuelta. 

A third day of racing was added, and the race dropped Madrid from the title to become the Challenge by La Vuelta as stages were held outside the borders of the Autonomous Community of Madrid. The rescheduled 2020 edition consisted of 2 short stages and an individual time trial.

Teams
Six of the eight UCI Women's WorldTeams and ten UCI Women's Continental Teams participated in the race. This meant that there were 84 starters, of which 67 finished.

UCI Women's WorldTeams

 
 
 
 
 
 

UCI Women's Continental Teams

Route and organization 
The race was increased from two stages in the past two editions to three this year, which race officials cited was due to the "uninterrupted growth dynamic that [the race] has maintained since its creation." The race started with a  hilly stage from Toledo to Escalona, followed by the traditional  individual time trial in Boadilla del Monte. The final stage was a  criterium in Madrid that used the same finishing circuit that was used for stage 21 of the 2020 Vuelta.

The event was organised by ASO, which also organises the Vuelta a España. It was the 11th and final race of the 2020 UCI Women's World Tour.

Stages

Stage 1 
6 November 2020 — Toledo to Escalona,

Stage 2 
7 November 2020 — Boadilla del Monte to Boadilla del Monte,  (ITT)

Stage 3 
8 November 2020 — Madrid to Madrid,

Classification leadership table 

 On stage 2, Elisa Balsamo, who was second in the points classification, wore the green jersey, because first placed Lorena Wiebes wore the red jersey as the leader of the general classification.
 On stage 3, Lorena Wiebes, who was second in the points classification, wore the green jersey, because first placed Lisa Brennauer wore the red jersey as the leader of the general classification.

Final classification standings

General classification

Points classification

Teams classification

See also 
 2020 in women's road cycling

References

External links 
 

2020 UCI Women's World Tour
2020
2020 in Spanish sport
Challenge by La Vuelta